Kimberleigh Marie Zolciak-Biermann (née Zolciak; born May 19, 1978) is an American television personality and singer. In 2008, she appeared as one of the original housewives on the reality television series The Real Housewives of Atlanta. Zolciak-Biermann left The Real Housewives of Atlanta in 2012 during the fifth season of the series, and returned as a "friend of the housewives" for the show's tenth season in 2017–18. 

In 2012, she received her own spin-off show titled Don't Be Tardy for the Wedding, which focused on the preparation of her wedding to football player Kroy Biermann. The series was subsequently renewed for a second season with a shortened title, Don't Be Tardy, and aired for eight seasons until the final episode on December 29, 2020. 

In 2015, she was one of the contestants of the 21st season of the dancing competition series Dancing with the Stars.

Early life
Kim Zolciak was born in Pensacola, Florida, to a military family, and grew up in Windsor Locks, Connecticut. Her parents are Joseph and Karen, and she has a brother named Michael. She is of Polish and Italian descent and was raised Roman Catholic.

At age 17, Zolciak had an affair with a Windsor Locks police sergeant who had interviewed her as a material witness in a criminal investigation, initially resulting in the officer's firing. The termination was later changed to a 45-day suspension without pay. She graduated from East Catholic High School in Manchester, Connecticut in 1996, and studied nursing at the University of Connecticut. At 21, she moved to Atlanta, Georgia, where her parents had moved, and eventually settled in the suburb of Johns Creek.

Career

Entertainment
Zolciak-Biermann first appeared on the reality television series The Real Housewives of Atlanta, airing on Bravo, on October 7, 2008. Between seasons four and five, Zolciak and her then fiancé were the subject of a spinoff show, Don't Be Tardy for the Wedding, chronicling Zolciak's wedding preparations. Zolciak left Real Housewives in the middle of the fifth season, with her final episode airing December 9, 2012. Don't Be Tardy for the Wedding, later renamed to Don't Be Tardy..., is in its eighth season as of 2020. Zolciak-Biermann returned to 'Real Housewives' for its tenth season in a recurring capacity.

Zolciak-Biermann was scheduled to star in a new reality show on Bravo with fellow The Real Housewives cast member, NeNe Leakes, called NeNe and Kim: The Road to Riches. However, the network later decided not to move forward with the show.

Zolciak-Biermann competed on the 21st season of the dancing competition show Dancing with the Stars. She was paired with professional dancer Tony Dovolani. She withdrew in September 2015, three weeks into the competition, because of a transient ischemic attack, which prevented her from air travel.

Musical career
In 2008, Zolciak began work on a country music album. She released a debut single, the dance track "Tardy for the Party", in 2009, followed by a remix EP the following year.

On March 12, 2013, Zolciak's Real Housewives of Atlanta castmate Kandi Burruss and her collaborating songwriter/producer Rodney "Don Vito" Richard filed suit against Zolciak for profits earned from "Tardy for the Party". In the documents filed, Burruss' attorney, RHOA castmate Phaedra Parks, alleges her clients wrote the song for Zolciak and that Zolciak released and sold the single "without [the] plaintiffs' authorization, license or consent." Burruss was also seeking a temporary restraining order to prevent future sales of the song and the "destruction of all copies of the infringing single and any other product of defendant's that infringe plaintiffs' copyrights", punitive damages, attorney's fees, and a jury trial.

Business
In May 2016, Zolciak-Biermann launched a line of skin-care products called Kashmere Kollection. Later in 2016, Zolciak began working on a perfume, also called Kashmere.

Personal life
Zolciak has a daughter from previous relationship, Brielle Karenna (born 1997). She married Daniel Toce in 2001 and that same year, they had a daughter named Ariana Lenee. The couple divorced in 2003.

Zolciak has publicly stated that she is bisexual and that she and DJ Tracy Young were in a romantic relationship.

In May 2010, Zolciak met Atlanta Falcons football player Kroy Biermann at the charity event Dancing with Atlanta Stars. Their meeting was later shown on season three of The Real Housewives of Atlanta. The couple wed at their Roswell, Georgia, home on November 11, 2011. They have four children together: Kroy Jagger "KJ" (born 2011), Kash Kade (born 2012), and twins Kaia Rose and Kane Ren (born 2013).

In March 2013, Biermann filed to adopt Zolciak's daughters. In July 2013, the adoption became final and the girls subsequently changed their last names to become Brielle Biermann and Ariana Biermann.

Discography

Singles

References

External links

 
 

1978 births
Living people
American dance musicians
American women pop singers
American people of Italian descent
American people of Polish descent
American socialites
American LGBT musicians
LGBT people from Florida
Singers from Connecticut
Singers from Georgia (U.S. state)
People from Windsor Locks, Connecticut
People from Roswell, Georgia
People from Fulton County, Georgia
The Real Housewives cast members
The Real Housewives of Atlanta
University of Connecticut alumni
21st-century American singers
21st-century American women singers